Dudas may refer to;
 Eszter Dudás, a Hungarian professional triathlete
 József Dudás, a Hungarian resistance leader, 
 Jon Dudas, Former under Secretary of Commerce for Intellectual Property and Director of the United States Patent and Trademark Office
 Richard Dudas American composer of contemporary classical music
  Dūdas, a Baltic bagpipe